Huai Kaeo may refer to:

 Huai Kaeo, Chiang Mai, a subdistrict (tambon) in Mae On District, Chiang Mai, Thailand
 Huai Kaeo Subdistrict in Phu Kamyao District, Phayao, Thailand
 Huai Kaeo Subdistrict in Bueng Na Rang District, Phichit, Thailand
 Huai Kaeo, a former name of Ban Mi District, Lop Buri, Thailand
 Huai Kaeo railway station, which serves the district